Francis Oscar Lindquist (September 27, 1869 – September 25, 1924) was a politician from the U.S. state of Michigan.

Lindquist was born in Marinette, Wisconsin on September 27, 1869 to a Norwegian-born mother and a Swedish-born father and attended the common schools. He moved to Greenville, Michigan, in 1904 and engaged in the mail-order clothing and manufacturing business. He moved to Grand Rapids in 1915 and became president of the Canada Mills Co., of New York and Michigan.

Lindquist was elected as a Republican from Michigan's 11th congressional district to the 63rd United States Congress, serving from March 4, 1913 to March 3, 1915. He won the election in a landslide, using mail-order tactics to canvass voters. He was not a candidate for renomination in 1914 and resumed the mail-order business in Grand Rapids. After the First World War, he returned to Greenville and supervised a correspondence-school course for sales people. In 1922, he lost to Bird J. Vincent in the Republican primary election for U.S. Representative in Michigan's 8th congressional district.

Lindquist died just two days before his 55th birthday, On September 25, 1924, in Grand Rapids and is interred at Forest Home Cemetery in Greenville.

References

The Political Graveyard

External links

1869 births
1924 deaths
People from Marinette, Wisconsin
American people of Swedish descent
American people of Norwegian descent
Republican Party members of the United States House of Representatives from Michigan
Politicians from Grand Rapids, Michigan
People from Greenville, Michigan
Businesspeople from Grand Rapids, Michigan
20th-century American politicians
Burials in Michigan